Dwain Clifford Sloat  (December 1, 1918 – April 18, 2003) was a pitcher in Major League Baseball. He pitched in nine games during the 1948 and 1949 seasons for the Brooklyn Dodgers and Chicago Cubs.

External links

 
Nokomis Illinois, Historical Society of Montgomery County Illinois

Major League Baseball pitchers
Brooklyn Dodgers players
Chicago Cubs players
1918 births
2003 deaths
Baseball players from Illinois
People from Nokomis, Illinois
Grand Forks Chiefs players
St. Paul Saints (AA) players
DeLand Reds players
Richmond Colts players
Meridian Peps players
Fort Worth Cats players
Toledo Mud Hens players
Atlanta Crackers players
Baltimore Orioles (IL) players